The Crown Colony of North Borneo was a Crown colony on the island of Borneo established in 1946 shortly after the dissolution of the British Military Administration. The Crown Colony of Labuan joined the new Crown Colony during its formation. It was succeeded as the state of Sabah through the formation of the Federation of Malaysia on 16 September 1963.

Cession of remaining islands 
On 16 October 1947, seven of the British-controlled islands in north-eastern Borneo named Turtle Islands, together with the Mangsee Islands, were ceded to the Philippine government under a past treaty signed between the United Kingdom and the United States. The islands now form a part of the Southwestern Tagalog Region (MIMAROPA) and Bangsamoro Autonomous Region in Muslim Mindanao (BARMM).

Administration 

The Governor of the Crown Colony of North Borneo (Malay: Tuan Yang Terutama Gabenor Koloni Mahkota British Borneo Utara) was the position created by the British Government upon the cession of North Borneo from the North Borneo Chartered Company. The appointment was made by King George VI, and later Queen Elizabeth II until the self-government of North Borneo on 31 August 1963 and the forming of the Federation of Malaysia on 16 September 1963. After the formation of Malaysia, the title was changed to 'Tuan Yang Terutama Yang di-Pertua Negeri Sabah', which also means 'His Excellency The Governor of Sabah', or 'His Excellency The Head of State of Sabah' and the appointment was later made by the Yang di-Pertuan Agong or King of Malaysia.

Executive and Legislative councils were established in October 1950, replacing the provisional Advisory Council which had existed since July 1946. The Executive Council, which advised the governor on matters of policy, consisted of three ex-officio members (the Chief Secretary, Financial Secretary, and Attorney-General), two appointed official members, and four appointed unofficial members. The Legislative Council consisted of the Governor as president, the three ex-officio members, nine appointed official members, and ten appointed unofficial members. The governor customarily appointed unofficial members from lists of names put forward by a representative bodies. Overall, the development of democratic institutions was much slower in North Borneo than it was in neighbouring Sarawak.

For local administration, the colony was divided into four residencies overseen by a resident, which were sub-divided into districts overseen by district officers. The district officer for the island of Labuan reported directly to the Chief Secretary. The districts were sub-divided into sub-districts overseen by assistant district officers. Most district officers were expatriates, while the majority of assistant district officers were locally recruited.

Within each district, village headmen were responsible for minor administrative tasks. Headmen reported to chiefs, who in turn reported to the district officer. The chiefs presided over native courts which dealt with breaches of native custom and Islamic law. District officers could also act in a magisterial capacity and had jurisdiction over civil actions, breaches of the laws of the Colony, and offences against the Penal Code.

In 1951, the Rural Development Ordinance provided for the establishment of local authorities in rural areas. The first such authority was set up in Kota Belud district on 1 January 1952 under the direction of the district and assistant district officers. Members of the local authority were entirely appointed, representing both the native population and the Chinese population of Kota Belud. This pattern was repeated throughout the territory as other rural authorities were established.

An ordinance regarding urban government came into force on 1 July 1954. It allowed the creation of township authorities, town boards, and municipal councils. Jesselton and Sandakan became town board areas, and in 1955 Tawau and Labuan joined them. Members of local councils were entirely appointed by the governor, though unofficial members were required to be in the majority.

References

Further reading 
 British North Borneo Becomes Crown Colony
 History  Sabah State Archives – Chief Minister's Department

External links 
 Colonial administration records (migrated archive): North Borneo (Sabah/Malaysia) at The National Archives (Pg. 61)

 
History of North Borneo
British rule in Malaysian history
North Borneo, Crown Colony of
History of Borneo
History of Sabah
North Borneo
Politics of Sabah
States and territories established in 1946
States and territories disestablished in 1963
1946 establishments in Southeast Asia
1963 disestablishments in Asia
1946 establishments in the British Empire
1963 disestablishments in the British Empire
1940s establishments in Malaya
1960s disestablishments in Malaysia